Stephen Townesend may refer to:
 Stephen Townesend (priest), Dean of Exeter, 1583–1588 
 Stephen Townesend (surgeon), English surgeon, stage actor, anti-vivisectionist and writer

See also
 Stephen J. Townsend, United States Army general